Clay County is located in the northeastern part of the U.S. state of Florida. As of 2020, the population was 218,245. Its county seat is Green Cove Springs. It is included in the Jacksonville metropolitan statistical area. It is named in honor of Henry Clay, a famous American statesman, member of the United States Senate from Kentucky, and United States Secretary of State in the 19th century.

History

Early in the 19th century, Zephaniah Kingsley built his prosperous Laurel Grove Plantation, planting oranges and trading slaves, where Orange Park is today.

Clay County was created on December 31, 1858, from a section of Duval County. The area was once a popular destination for tourists because of its hot springs and mild climate. Steamboats brought them to various hotels in Green Cove Springs, such as the St. Elmo, Clarendon, and Oakland. President Grover Cleveland was the most prominent of such tourists and had spring water shipped to the White House. Clay County's popularity among tourists peaked during the last three decades of the 19th century. Tourism later waned because of Henry Flagler's extension of the Florida East Coast Railway to other destinations such as Palm Beach and Miami.

The military has also played an important role in Clay County history. In 1939, Camp Blanding opened on Kingsley Lake in southwest Clay County. The Florida National Guard developed this  complex. During World War II, it trained over 90,000 troops and became the fourth-largest "city" in the state. In Green Cove Springs, Lee Field was a flight training center. After World War II, Lee Field became a base for the mothball fleet. Although Lee Field closed in the early 1960s, Camp Blanding continues to operate today as a base for military training. Clay County is also a popular choice of residence for military personnel stationed on bases in nearby Duval County (NAS Jacksonville, NS Mayport, and, before it closed, NAS Cecil Field).

Geography

Adjacent counties
 Alachua County, Florida - southwest
 Duval County, Florida - north
 St. Johns County, Florida - east
 Putnam County, Florida - south
 Bradford County, Florida - west
 Baker County, Florida - northwest

Transportation

Airports
 Keystone Heights Airport

Major highways

Demographics

As of the 2020 United States census, there were 218,245 people, 75,360 households, and 57,587 families residing in the county.

At the 2010 census, 190,865 people, 65,356 households, and 39,390 families resided in the county. The majority of Clay County's population was located in the northeastern region, where large suburban communities have been built. Orange Park, Middleburg, and the surrounding area specifically have the majority of the population. Green Cove Springs area has the lower population spread west and south, along with the small city of Keystone Heights, which lies at the southwestern end of the county. Although the population of Clay County is relatively high, the majority of the county is still rural and consists of many farms connected by county roads. The 73,208 housing units averaged 89 per square mile (35/km2). The racial makeup of the county was 81.8% White, 9.9% Black or African American, 0.5% Native American, 2.9% Asian, 0.1% Pacific Islander, 1.1% from other races, and 2.9% from two or more races. About 7.7% of the population were Hispanic or Latino, with Puerto Ricans being the majority of the Hispanic population.
There were 50,243 households, 39.60% had children under the age of 18 living with them, 63.80% were married couples living together, 10.70% had a female householder with no husband present, and 21.60% were not families. Around 16.90% of households were one person and 5.50% were one person aged 65 or older. The average household size was 2.77, and the average family size was 3.11.

The age distribution was 28.00% under the age of 18, 7.90% from 18 to 24, 30.30% from 25 to 44, 24.00% from 45 to 64, and 9.80% 65 or older. The median age was 36 years. For every 100 females, there were 97.00 males. For every 100 females age 18 and over, there were 94.20 males.

The median income for a household was $48,854 and for a family was $53,814. Males had a median income of $36,683 versus $25,488 for females. The per capita income for the county was $20,868. About 5.10% of families and 6.80% of the population were below the poverty line, including 8.90% of those under age 18 and 7.40% of those age 65 or over.

Government 
Clay County's large population in unincorporated areas is served by the Clay County Sheriff's Office and Clay County Fire & Rescue. The current Sheriff, Michelle Cook (R), was elected in 2020.

Board of County Commissioners 
Clay County's government is led by a five-member Board of County Commissioners, each elected from a single-member district. The county commission appoints a County Manager as chief administrative officer of the county. Howard Wannamaker currently serves as the County Manager. The current office holders are,

 District 1: Alexandra Compere (R)
 District 2: Wayne Bolla (R)
 District 3: Jim Renninger (R)
 District 4: Betsy Condon (R)
 District 5: Kristen Burke (R)

Politics

Voter registration
According to the Florida Department of State, Republicans account for a majority of registered voters in Clay County.

Statewide elections
Politically, Clay County is one of the most reliably Republican counties in the state during presidential elections outside of the Panhandle. It last supported a Democrat for president in 1960, and Jimmy Carter is the last Democrat to manage even 40 percent of the county's vote. However, conservative Democrats continued to hold most state and local offices well into the 1980s.

Museums
 Clay County Historical and Railroad Museum, Green Cove Springs
 Middleburg Historical Museum, Middleburg
 Black Heritage Museum, Middleburg
 Camp Blanding Museum, Camp Blanding

Education
The Clay County School District operates 42 public schools, with currently 28 elementary schools, five junior high schools, six high schools, and one junior/senior high school.

Libraries
The Clay County Public Library System consists of five branches:
 Green Cove Springs Library
 Headquarters Library (Fleming Island)
 Keystone Heights Library
 Middleburg-Clay Hill Library
 Orange Park Library

The first public library in Clay County was made up of a small collection established by the Village Improvement Association within the county. Other small libraries were established by other organizations within Clay County. In 1961, representatives from different women's organizations in the county started a movement to establish a library system within the county, and resulted in the Clay County Board of County Commissioners beginning to set aside funds to create the county library system. Due to their efforts, the first public library in Clay County was opened in 1961 in Green Cove Springs. The Green Cove Springs Library purchased a bookmobile in 1962 and began to provide outreach services to different areas within Clay County that same year. In 1962 two more public libraries opened in Clay County, the Keystone Heights Library and the Orange Park Library. A fire destroyed the Keystone Heights Library in February 1962. The Keystone Heights Library was relocated to a new building in Theme Park in 1964. The Headquarters Library in Green Cove Springs became open to the public in 1970 after a population boom caused the need for a new library. In 1976, the Orange Park Library moved to a larger location within the town of Orange Park. The population growth experienced in the county during the late 1970s necessitated the development of the Middleburg-Clay Hill Library, which first opened in a storefront in the late 1970s. The permanent facility for this library was completed and opened to the public in 1986.

Communities

Cities
 Green Cove Springs
 Keystone Heights

Towns
 Orange Park
 Penney Farms

Census-designated places

 Asbury Lake
 Bellair-Meadowbrook Terrace
 Fleming Island
 Lakeside
 Middleburg
 Oakleaf Plantation

Other unincorporated communities

 Belmore
 Clay Hill
 Doctors Inlet
 Hibernia
 Lake Geneva
 McRae
 Virginia Village

See also
 National Register of Historic Places listings in Clay County, Florida

References

External links

 Clay County Government

 
Florida counties
1858 establishments in Florida
Counties in the Jacksonville metropolitan area
Charter counties in Florida
North Florida
Populated places established in 1858